Carabus albrechti tsukubanus is a subspecies of ground beetle in the subfamily Carabinae that is endemic to Japan.

References

External links
Carabus albrechti tsukubanus

albrechti tsukubanus
Beetles described in 1997
Endemic fauna of Japan